John C. Hein (January 27, 1886 – August 29, 1963) was an American wrestler who competed in the 1904 Summer Olympics. In 1904, Hein won a silver medal in the light flyweight division.

References

External links
 

1886 births
1963 deaths
Wrestlers at the 1904 Summer Olympics
American male sport wrestlers
Olympic silver medalists for the United States in wrestling
Medalists at the 1904 Summer Olympics